KNU can refer to:

Education
 Kagawa Nutrition University
 Kangwon National University
 Kazi Nazrul University
 Kongju National University
 Korea Nazarene University
 Kyiv National University
 Kyungpook National University

Other
 Karen National Union
 Kanpur Airport